Johnny Szlykowicz (born 3 December 1980 in Beaune, Côte-d'Or) is a former Polish-French football player.

Career
He signed a contract with Neuchâtel Xamax on 5 September 2006, after scored 4 goals in 5 games at the start of season for SR Delémont.

Personal life
His father Zbigniew Szłykowicz was a professional footballer.

External links
Profile

1980 births
Living people
People from Beaune
French footballers
Neuchâtel Xamax FCS players
Swiss Super League players
Association football midfielders
AJ Auxerre players
Pau FC players
SR Delémont players
FC Lausanne-Sport players
French people of Polish descent
French expatriate sportspeople in Switzerland
Sportspeople from Côte-d'Or
Footballers from Bourgogne-Franche-Comté
French expatriate footballers
Expatriate footballers in Switzerland